Valentín Tornos López (4 January 1901 – 19 September 1976) was a Spanish film and television actor.

Filmography

References

Bibliography
 Peter Cowie & Derek Elley. World Filmography: 1967. Fairleigh Dickinson University Press, 1977.

External links
 

1901 births
1976 deaths
Spanish male film actors
Male actors from Madrid